Namila Benson is an Australian-born Papua New Guinean radio broadcaster, podcaster and television presenter.

Early life
Namila was born in Australia of Papua New Guinean parents. She is a Tolai woman from Rabaul in the East New Britain Province in Papua New Guinea, and was born in Melbourne, Australia. 

Her father, Warium Benson, worked as a broadcaster for 36 years with Radio Australia, between 1975 and 2011.

Career
Since starting in radio at Melbourne community broadcaster, 3CR in the mid-nineties, Namila spent two and a half decades  working across a number of media platforms, including as a field reporter on the Australian Broadcasting Corporation (ABC) television arts show, Art Nation, as a producer and presenter on Radio Australia's Pacific Service and presenter on 3RRR FM radio. 

Between 2017 and 2019, she worked as a producer on the Radio National mornings program, Life Matters. In 2019, she moved across to presenting and co-producing the national visual arts program, The Art Show, on ABC Radio National.

In April 2021, the ABC announced that Benson would host a weekly TV arts show named Art Works. The first season of the show was broadcast between 5 May 2021and 15 December 2021 on ABC TV.

Other activities

Namila has acted as a mentor to help young people get into media in Australia and abroad. She has run workshops at radio stations 3CR, SYN, PBS 106.7FM and 3RRR. 

In 2015, she worked in Papua New Guinea, running media training with producers, presenters and journalists from the National Broadcasting Corporation of Papua New Guinea (NBC).

In 2019, Namila hosted talks with Jack Charles and various special guests at The Melba Spiegeltent in Melbourne.

She hosted conversations with singer Archie Roach, and renowned First Nations elder, actor and activist Jack Charles, at the Stories of Song and Resilience Event on 4 December 2017 at the Sydney Opera House.

In 2019, Wil Anderson featured Namila on Episode #151 of his podcast, Wilosophy.

Publications 
In 2019, Namila authored the memoir of Jack Charles: Jack Charles: Born-Again Blakfella, published on 18 August 2020 by Penguin Books. The memoir was shortlisted by the Australian Book Industry Awards as the 2020 Biography Book of the Year.

Art Works Season 1 

Namila hosted 33 episodes of the ABC Television show Art Works in 2021. Art Works aired on ABC TV and ABC TV Plus, and continues to be viewable on ABC iView.

Art Works Season 2 
Namila hosted 37 episodes of the second season of ABC Television show Art Works in 2022 which began airing on ABC TV on the 16th of March 2022.

References

External links

Living people
Year of birth missing (living people)
Papua New Guinean women
Australian television presenters